The 18403 / 04 Rourkela - Barbil Intercity Express is an Express train belonging to Indian Railways East Coast Railway zone that runs between  and  in India.

It was started as Chakradharpur–Barbil Intercity Express on 15 July 2012, After 8 Feb 2019 it was extended up to Rourkela and runs as Rourkela–Barbil Intercity Express.

Coaches
The 18403 / 04 Rourkela - Barbil Intercity Express has  one AC chair car, one Chair car, eight general unreserved & two SLR (seating with luggage rake) coaches. It does not carry a pantry car coach.

As is customary with most train services in India, coach composition may be amended at the discretion of Indian Railways depending on demand.

Service

Routing

Traction
As the route is electrified, a  based WAP-4 electric locomotive pulls the train to its destination.

References

External links
18403 Intercity Express at India Rail Info
18404 Intercity Express at India Rail Info

Intercity Express (Indian Railways) trains
Rail transport in Jharkhand
Rail transport in Odisha